The Uranium Mill Tailings Radiation Control Act (1978) is a United States environmental law that amended the Atomic Energy Act of 1954 and authorized the Environmental Protection Agency to establish health and environmental standards for the stabilization, restoration, and disposal of uranium mill waste. Title 1 of the Act required the EPA to set environmental protection standards consistent with the Resource Conservation and Recovery Act, including groundwater protection limits; the Department of Energy to implement EPA standards and provide perpetual care for some sites; and the Nuclear Regulatory Commission to review cleanups and license sites to states or the DOE for perpetual care. Title 1 established a uranium mill remedial action program jointly funded by the federal government and the state. Title 1 of the Act also designated 22 inactive uranium mill sites for remediation, resulting in the containment of 40 million cubic yards of low-level radioactive material in UMTRCA Title 1 holding cells.

Limitations
The act was written in the "hectic final days" of the 95th U.S. Congress and contained multiple errors that made it "a nightmare of statutory construction," and required remedial legislation to fix. The act perpetuated the "Agreement State" program, established in 1959, in which the Atomic Energy Commission gave regulatory authority of certain nuclear materials to states. It was unclear how much regulatory power Agreement states had, and as a result these states took little regulatory action. Sites that were owned by the federal government, the NRC, or Agreement states were ineligible for remedial action under the UMTRCA, as they were instead the responsibility of the government agencies or states who owned them.

See also
Uranium Mill Tailings Remedial Action
Uranium mining

References

External links
 
 
 
 
 

Waste legislation in the United States
Radioactive waste
1978 in American law
United States federal energy legislation
95th United States Congress
1978 in the environment